Vecherniy Krasnoyarsk (Russian: "Вечерний Красноярск" ~ The Evening Krasnoyarsk) is a weekly newspaper published in Krasnoyarsk, Russia since 1989.  It comes out on Wednesdays.  

As of January 9, 2005, the circulation is 23,000.

As of 2007, the editor-in-chief is Yevgeniya Leontyeva.

External links

Newspapers published in the Soviet Union
Newspapers established in 1989
Russian-language newspapers published in Russia
Krasnoyarsk